Zahid Maleque (born 11 April 1959) is a Bangladesh Awami League politician and the incumbent Minister of Health and Family Welfare.  He is the incumbent Jatiya Sangsad member from the Manikganj-3 constituency.

In 2016, Maleque received WHO award on behalf of the health ministry for reducing child mortality. He has faced criticism over his handling of the COVID-19 pandemic in Bangladesh.

Early life 
Maleque was born on 11 April 1959 in Garpara Union, Manikganj Sadar Upazila, Manikgonj District in the then East Pakistan. He completed his undergrad & postgrad in English from the University of Dhaka. His parents were Colonel M. A. Maleque and Fouzia Maleque. His father was a former minister, a former mayor of Dhaka, and member of parliament.

Career 
Maleque is the chairman of Sun Life Insurance Company Limited, Bangladesh Thai Aluminium Limited, World Wide Enterprise Limited, Rahat Real Estate and Construction Limited and Pristine Color Limited.

Maleque contested the General Election in 2001 from Manikganj-3 as a candidate of Awami League and lost to Harunur Rashid Khan Monno of Bangladesh Nationalist Party.

Maleque contested the General Election in 2008 from Manikganj-3 as a candidate of Awami League and won defeating Harunur Rashid Khan Monno of Bangladesh Nationalist Party.

Maleque was re-elected unopposed from Manikganj-3 in the 2014 general election as a candidate of Awami League. The election was boycotted by all major political parties in Bangladesh.

Maleque was re-elected from Manikganj-3 in the 2018 general election as a candidate of Awami League. His opponent, Afroza Khan Rita, from Bangladesh Nationalist Party was barred from standing by Bangladesh Supreme Court after Sonali Bank Limited claimed she defaulted on 18 billion taka loan from the bank. Afroza Khan Rita is the daughter of Harunur Rashid Khan Monno. He received 220 thousand votes while his nearest rival, Mifizul Islam Khan Kamal from Gono Forum, received 29 thousand votes.

On 23 March 2020, Maleque reported that the government had enough protective gear and testing kits for the COVID-19 pandemic in Bangladesh.

Maleque was criticised in a session at the parliament of Bangladesh on 30 June 2020. Member of Parliament Pir Fazlur Rahman called for his removal and replacement by Matia Chowdhury. Mujibul Haque Chunnu, Member of Parliament criticised his handling of the COVID-19 pandemic in Bangladesh. He said that health workers in his constituency got infected with COVID-19 after receiving poor quality protective equipment. Members of Parliament Rowshan Ara Mannan and Harunur Rashid also criticised him in the parliamentary session. On 14 July 2020, he denied there was any tensions between the Ministry of Health and Family Welfare and the Directorate General of Health Services.

On 12 December 2020, Maleque reported that the government has spent 400 thousand taka per patient of COVID-19. He issued a statement on 30 December 2020 that the COVID-19 situation in Bangladesh was under control.

On 9 March 2021, Maleque said that the pandemic exposed weakness of the healthcare system in Bangladesh. He also claimed that the Government of Bangladesh reacted quickly to the pandemic.

References

Living people
1959 births
People from Manikganj District
Awami League politicians
State Ministers of Health and Family Welfare (Bangladesh)
Health and Family Welfare ministers of Bangladesh
9th Jatiya Sangsad members
10th Jatiya Sangsad members
11th Jatiya Sangsad members